Nawra  is a village in the administrative district of Gmina Nowe Miasto Lubawskie, within Nowe Miasto County, Warmian-Masurian Voivodeship, in northern Poland.

History
During the German occupation of Poland (World War II), the local forest was the site of a massacre of over 150 Poles from the nearby town of Nowe Miasto Lubawskie and other nearby villages, carried out by the Germans in 1939 as part of the Intelligenzaktion.

References

Nawra
Nazi war crimes in Poland